Dennistoun (Ward 22) is one of the 23 wards of Glasgow City Council; used since the 2017 local election, it is one of two created from the Local Government Boundary Commission for Scotland's 5th Review. The ward returns three council members.

Boundaries
Located east of Glasgow city centre, the ward is centred around Dennistoun, although does not include all of the district - the Reidvale streets to the south of Duke Street are within the Calton ward. It was created in 2017 from the East Centre ward (the Dennistoun, Milnbank and Haghill neighbourhoods), the Springburn ward (the Royston, Germiston and Sighthill neighbourhoods along with commercial/industrial land at Blochairn and St Rollox) and a small part of the Anderston/City ward (the Ladywell neighbourhood and the grounds of Glasgow Royal Infirmary).

Councillors

Election results

2022 election

2017 election

See also
Wards of Glasgow

References

External links
Listed Buildings in Dennistoun Ward, Glasgow City at British Listed Buildings

Wards of Glasgow
2017 establishments in Scotland